Lollu Sabha is a 2003-2008 Indian Tamil-language comedy series written by Rambhala and starring Lollu Sabha Jeeva, Swaminathan, Lollu Sabha Manohar, Balaji, Santhanam and Jangiri Madhumitha. It was broadcast on STAR Vijay with 156 episodes. Each episode of the series was a spoof of a Tamil feature film and television show. Comedy actor Santhanam, Swaminathan, Manohar, Yogi Babu and Madhumitha are the leads of the show.

Cast

Development
In 2004, Rambhala pitched the idea of Lollu Sabha to the Star Vijay group's programming head Pradeep Milroy Peter, who approved for the show to be made. The concept was initially supposed to be a two-minute skit as a part of another show called Breakfast Show that Rambhala was working on, but the channel's head, Vijay Iyer, asked for 30-minute episodes to be made instead. The success of Lollu Sabha paved the way for a new era of comedy shows across Tamil channels.

List

Films spoofed

7G Rainbow Colony [7G Orampo Colony]
Aaru [Aaru Padu Joru]
Aayutha Ezhuthu [ஃ Ezhuthu]
 Alaipayuthey [Ullaikothikuthe]
Amaidhi Padai
Aarulirinthu Aruvathu varai [Aarulirunthu Arukkura Varai]
Amarkalam [Amakkalam]
Amman Kovil Kizhakale [Aayaa Koil Appaale]
Anandham [Anandham Illeengo]
 Anbe Aaruyire [Attupiecey Aayaamoonjey]
 Annamalai [Ennaamalai]
 Anniyan [Onion]
 Andha 7 Naatkal [Andha 7½ Naatkal]
 Arindhum Ariyamalum [Avindhum Aviyamalum]
 Arunachalam [Andaachalam]
 Attagasam [Kettavaasam]
 Autograph [Summergraph]
 Avvai Shanmughi [Avvai Chappamuki]
 Ayyaa [Paiyaa]
 Baasha [Bacha]
 Baba [Maavaa]
 Bharatha Vilas [Bar Atha Vilas]
 Billa [Gulla]
 Chandramukhi [Sappamuki]
 Cheran Pandiyan [Seraatha Pandiyan]
 Chinna Gounder [Donna Gounder]
 Chinna Thambi [Chinna Thumbi]
 Citizen [Jettisen]
 C. I. D. Shankar [Co. Me. Dy. Shankar]
 Dhavani Kanavugal [Thalakaani Kanavugal]
 Dheena [Onaa]
 Dhill [Dhill Irundha Parunga]
 Dhool [Siyakkaai Dhool]
 Duet [Duet: Vayasaanavanga Paadunadhu]
 Ethir Neechal [Edhu Neechal]
 Enga Ooru Pattukaran [Enga Area Paattukaaran]
 Enga Veettu Pillai [Ethir Veettu Pillai]
 Ejamaan
 Evana Irundha Enakenna [Evana Irundha Velakkenna]
 Gentleman [Kindalman]
 Gunaa [Ena]
 Gilli [Jalli]
 Ithu Thaanda Police [Idhudhanda Foolish]
 Idhayam [Idhayam Illathavan]
 Idhaya Kovil [Idhu En Kovil]
 Indian [Gindian]
 Jayam [Bhayam]
 Kaadhal [Kaadhal Vaysanathu]
 Kaakha Kaakha [Kaakkaa Kaakkaa - The Foolish]
 Kadalora Kavithaigal [Kadalora Kazhuthaigal]
 Kadhal Kondein [Kadalai Kondein]
 Kadhal Kottai [Kadhal Settai]
 Kadhal Mannan [Kathaala Mannan]
 Kadhalukku Mariyadhai [Kadhaluku Avamariyadhai]
 Kandukondain Kandukondain [Kandukaatha Kandukaatha]
 Karakattakkaran [Keragaattakaaran]
 Kattradhu Thamizh [Katradhu Dumeel]
 Keladi Kanmani [Keladi Kullamani]
 Kireedom [Freedom]
 Kizhake Pogum Rail [Kurukke Pogum Rail]
 Kizhakku Vaasal [Kirukku Vaasal]
 Kizhakku Seemaiyile [Kelatu Seemaiyile]
 M. Kumaran S/O Mahalakshmi [M. Kullan S/O Megalakshmi]
 Maayi [Paayi]
Mann Vasanai [Masala Vaasanai]
 Malaiyoor Mambattiyan [Mylapore Mambattiyan]
 Manithan [Manithan Maaritaan]
 Mella Thirandhathu Kadhavu [Mollama Thorangada Kadhava]
 Minnale [Kindale]
 Minsaara Kanavu [Minsara Kanaa]
 Moondru Mugam [Muthina Mugam]
 Mr. Bharath [Mixture Barath]
 Mudhalvan
 Mugavaree [Mughaveri]
 Muthu
 Muthal Mariyathai [Rendavathu Mariyathai]
 Mythili Ennai Kaathali [Mythili En Thalavali]
 Naalai Namadhe
 Naan Avan Illai [Naan Avan Illeengo]
 Nandhaa [Indhaa]
 Narasimha [Narasamma]
 Natpukkaaga [Oppukkaaga]
 Nattamai [NOT Taamai]
 Nayakan [Vinaayagan]
 Nenjam Marappathillai [Konjam Marappathillai]
 Nenjil Or Aalayam
 New [Q]
 Padayappa [Vadaiyappa]
 Pallaandu Vaazhga [Full Aandu Vaazhga]
 Pallikoodam [Edaakoodam]
 Pithamagan [Peelamagan]
 Pokkiri [Bakkery]
 Ponnumani
 Poovellam Un Vaasam [Pooriyellam Kizhangu Vaasam]
 Priya [Freeya Paarunga]
 Pudhupettai [Pudhu Settai]
 Pudhu Pudhu Arthangal [Puthu Puthu Varuthangal]
 Pudhu Vasantham
Paandavar Bhoomi [Aandavar Bhoomi]
 Ramanaa [Summanaa]
 Raja Chinna Roja [Raja Dammathundu Roja]
 Ratha Kanneer [Sotha Kanneer]
 Roja
 Run [Run: 0 for All Out]
 Samsaram Adhu Minsaram [Samsaram Adhu Avatharam]
 Sangamam [Sangrumam]
 Santosh Subramaniam [Santhula Subramaniyam]
 Salangai Oli [Sangada Oli]
 Saraswathi Sabatham
 Seevalaperi Pandi [Seevala Berikka Pandi]
 Sindhu Bhairavi [Sindhu By Ravi]
 Sivakasi [Amukkivaasi]
 Something Something Unakkum Enakkum [Nothing Nothing Ungalukkum Engalukkum]
 Subramaniapuram [Supermaniyapuram]
 Sullan [Ullaan]
 Suryavamsam [Loosvamsam]
 Thalapathi [Thalavithi]
 Thambi [Thumbi]
 Thanga Padhakkam [Thangaatha Padhakkam]
 Thavamai Thavamirundhu [Kadanaai kadanirunthu]
 Thee [Tea]
 Thevar Magan [Thenavattu magan]
 Thillana Mohanambal
 Thimiru [Thimiru Engalukkillai]
 Thiruda Thiruda
 Thirumalai [Thirumazhai]
 Thirupaachi [Veruppaachi]
 Thiruvilaiyadal
 Thiruttu Payale [Thiruttu Pasanga]
 Thotti Jaya [Vetti Jaya]
 Unnidathil Ennai Koduthen [Unnidathil Vennai Koduthen]
 Uyirullavarai Usha
 Varalaru [Thagaraaru: Bad Father]
 Varavu Nalla Uravu [Varavu Romba Koravu]
 Vaaname Ellai [Vaanarame Thollai]
 Vaanathaipola [Varuvaarupola]
 Vaazhkai [Vazhukkai]
 Vedham Pudhithu [Saadham Puthithu]
 Vetri Kodi Kattu [Vetri Pottiya Kattu]
 Vettaiyaadu Vilaiyaadu [Vettaiyadu Velladu]
 Veyil [Uchi Veyil]
 Virumaandi [Kurumaandi]
 Walter Vetrivel [Vaal Paiyan Vetrivel]
 Yaaradi Nee Mohini [Yaarada nee komaali]
Ponniyin Selvan: I [Po nee selva]TBA

TV shows spoofed
 Leoni Pattimandram [Idli vs Dosa / Trisha vs Jyothika]
 Arattai Arangam [Parattai Arangam]
 Pepsi Ungal Choice [Goli Soda Ungal Choice]
 Top 10 Movies [Countrywoods Kandravi Countdown]
 Sun Rise Neengal Ketta Paadal [Lemon Rice Yarumae Ketta Paadal]
 Malarum Mottum [Pinjile Pazhuthadu]
 Kaun Banega Crorepati [Kaun Banega Pichadipathi]
 Star Cricket [Judgement Day]
 Kathayalla Nijam [Kathaiyalla Kasmaalam]
 Kalakka Povathu Yaaru [Odhai Vaanga Povadhu Yaaru]
 Madhan's Thirai Paarvai [Budhans Durapaarvai]
 Grandmaster [Pasanga Manasula Yaaru? Andha Figure-ku Enna Peru]
 Mudhal Vanakkam
 Neeya Naana [Veena Pona Suna Paana]
Indha Naal Iniya Naal [Indha Naal Imsai Naal]

Others
Raapichai
Poli Doctor Pothiraj
Buildup Peelarao
Mega Serialnga Romba Thollainga
Siri Siri Darbar
Veerappan
Modern Swayamvaram
Bhagavathar vs Michael Jackson
Thalaippu Vekka Therila
Bioscope

Controversy
At the height of the show's success, Manohar, along with three other cast members, received mysterious parcel bombs. There was another controversy where the show's crew were forced to tender apology for parodying the film Pokkiri.

See also
 Joking Bad

References

External links
 Lollu Sabha on YouTube
 Official website

Star Vijay original programming
2000s Tamil-language television series
Tamil-language comedy television series
2004 Tamil-language television series debuts
Tamil-language television shows
2007 Tamil-language television series endings